Goodnight, Sweet Marilyn is a 1989 film by director Larry Buchanan. The film is a follow-up to his 1976 film Goodbye, Norma Jean, and starred Misty Rowe reprising her role as the young Marilyn Monroe.

Cast
 Paula Lane as Marilyn Monroe
 Misty Rowe as Norma Jean Baker
 Jeremy Slate as "Mesquite"
 Joyce Lower as Psychiatrist
 Ken Hicks as Medical Doctor
 Phyllis Coates as Gladys Pearl Baker
 George Niles Berry as Masseur
 Gerry Hopkins as Madison Square Garden Announcer
 Terence Locke as Ralph Johnson
 Patch Mackenzie as Ruth Latimer
 Preston Hanson as Hal James
 Marty Zagon as Irving Oblach
 Andre Philippe as Sam Dunn
 Adele Claire as Beverly
 Sal Ponti as Randy Palmer
 Stuart Lancaster as George
 Garth Pillsbury as Police Officer

References

External links

1989 films
Films about Marilyn Monroe
Films directed by Larry Buchanan
1980s English-language films